NCAA Lacrosse Championship may refer to:
NCAA Men's Lacrosse Championship, the tournament determines the top Men's Field Lacrosse team in the NCAA  Division I, Division II, and Division III.
NCAA Women's Lacrosse Championship, the tournament determines the top women's lacrosse team in the NCAA  Division I, Division II, and Division III.

Lacrosse
NCAA lacrosse